Fulham Court Estate is a council estate in the Fulham district of London, England.

Fulham Court Estate consists of a number of four-storey blocks without lift access built in the 1930s.

In February 2022, Stephen Wallis, aged 50, was found dead at his flat in Barclay Close, and a 52-year-old man was arrested and charged with murder five days later.

References

Fulham